Lolenga Mock (born 22 April 1972) is a Danish professional boxer. He held the European Union super-middleweight title three times between 2006 and 2011. A veteran of the sport for more than 25 years, Mock is known for his toughness and has only ever been stopped once in his career.

Professional career
Born in Zaire (now the Democratic Republic of the Congo), Mock made his professional debut on 11 May 1991, fighting in several countries across Africa and winning his first seventeen fights. In 2000 he fought in Europe for the first time, where he would later become a Danish citizen. On 26 September 2003, he fought future world champion David Haye at cruiserweight. Despite scoring a knockdown against Haye in the second round, Mock was stopped in the fourth. A fight against another future world champion came against Lucian Bute on 16 May 2006, which ended in a twelve-round unanimous decision loss for Mock.

On 3 November 2006, Mock won his first major regional championship—the vacant European Union super-middleweight title—when he defeated Franck Mezaache via fifth-round corner stoppage. Having vacated the title after one defence, Mock won it twice more on 14 March 2008 and 30 January 2010, against Mouhamed Ali Ndiaye and Giovanni De Carolis respectively. In 2016, Mock had his busiest ever year as a professional, having six fights in Denmark and winning each time.

Professional boxing record

References

External links

Danish male boxers
Super-middleweight boxers
Light-heavyweight boxers
1972 births
Sportspeople from Kinshasa
Living people
Danish people of Democratic Republic of the Congo descent